Casualty may refer to:

Casualty (person), a person who is killed or rendered unfit for service in a war or natural disaster
Civilian casualty, a non-combatant killed or injured in warfare
 The emergency department of a hospital, also known as a Casualty Department or Casualty Ward (chiefly in the UK and in some English-speaking Commonwealth nations)
Casualty (TV series), a long-running British emergency medical drama series
Casualty 1900s, a British medical drama, then series, including Casualty 1906, Casualty 1907, and Casualty 1909
Casualty insurance, a type of insurance

See also
Casual (disambiguation)
Causality (disambiguation)